Bordeaux–Mérignac Airport  is the international airport of Bordeaux, in south-western France. It mainly features flights to metropolitan and leisure destinations in Europe and Northern Africa and serves as a base for easyJet, Ryanair and Volotea airlines.

History
KG 40, the prime land-based maritime patrol Luftwaffe unit was primarily based at Bordeaux-Mérignac during the Occupation of France in World War II.

Terminals
Bordeaux Airport has three passenger buildings:

 Terminal A is mainly for international flights
 Terminal B  passenger air terminal has two levels and is principally dedicated to Air France traffic between Paris and Bordeaux.
 Terminal billi is a separate facility for low cost carriers. It has one floor and has small check-in and arrivals areas as well as a departures area with six aircraft parking positions which are used for walk boarding.  Users of Terminal billi are easyJet, Ryanair and Wizz Air.

Airlines and destinations
The following airlines operate regular scheduled and charter flights from Bordeaux–Mérignac Airport:

Statistics

Access

Road
The airport is accessible by road via the A630 autoroute (exit 11b). There is a shuttle by 30'Direct shuttle serving the Bordeaux Saint-Jean railway station. Bus route 1+ of Transports Bordeaux Métropole serves the city centre.

Tram
The Bordeaux tramway system does not yet reach the airport, but an extension to Line A is expected to link the airport with the city centre by 2022.

See also
United States Air Force in France

References

External links

Official website 
Aéroport de Bordeaux (Union des Aéroports Français) 

Airports in Nouvelle-Aquitaine
Installations of the French Air and Space Force
Buildings and structures in Bordeaux
Transport in Nouvelle-Aquitaine